The USB Implementers Forum (USB-IF) is a nonprofit organization created to promote and support USB (Universal Serial Bus).  Its main activities are the promotion and marketing of USB, Wireless USB, USB On-The-Go, and the maintenance of the specifications, as well as a compliance program.

The USB-IF was founded in 1995 by the group of companies that was developing USB, which was released in 1996. The founding companies of USB-IF were Compaq, Digital, IBM, Intel, Microsoft, NEC and Nortel. Notable current members include HP, NEC, Microsoft, Apple Inc., Intel, and Agere Systems.

The working committees within USB-IF are:
 Device Working Group
 Compliance Committee
 Marketing Committee

The USB-IF web caters to developers who may sign up freely to the developer web-forums and access documentation. To join a working group, however, one has to work for a member company or register as a member. The developer forums oversee the development of the USB connector, of other USB hardware, and of USB software; they are not end-user forums.

In 2014, the USB-IF announced USB-C. USB-C connectors can transfer data with rates up to 10 Gbit/s and provides up to 100 watts of power.

In 2015, the seven-person board of directors, led by USB-IF President and Chief Operating Officer Jeff Ravencraft, consisted of representatives of Apple, HP Inc., Intel Corporation, Microsoft Corporation, Renesas Electronics, STMicroelectronics, and Texas Instruments.

In 2020, USB-IF announced updated USB Device Class Definition for MIDI Devices, Version 2.0 in support of MIDI 2.0 devices. According to Valdosta Daily Times, "The standard represents an industry-wide effort by the USB-IF, MIDI Manufacturers Association (MMA), and Association of Musical Electronics Industry (AMEI) to provide MIDI users with an expanded MIDI environment connected by USB." USB-IF President and COO, Jeff Ravencraft said, "USB-IF is proud to support the MMA and AMEI by publishing an updated USB Device Class Specification for next-generation MIDI devices. USB has been an integral part of the MIDI environment over the past 20 years, and we look forward to seeing innovative new devices that are enabled by this updated specification."

Obtaining a vendor ID

A vendor ID is necessary for obtaining a certification of compliance from the USB-IF. The USB-IF is responsible for issuing USB vendor IDs to product manufacturers. The cost for issuing this number is US$5,000 per year. Additionally, the use of a trademarked USB logo to identify certified devices requires license fee of US$3,500 for a 2-year term.  Some microcontroller manufacturers offer a free or low cost sublicense of their vendor ID for development/testing and limited production (generally under 10,000 units). Vendors offering this free service include:
 Dream S.A.S.
 Energy Micro
 FTDI
 Luminary Micro
 Microchip
 NXP
 Silicon Labs
 STMicroelectronics
 Texas Instruments
Alternatively, many members of the open source community promote the use of USB VID 0xF055 (visually similar to FOSS) for open-source hardware projects. Although this VID is not registered to any company (as of October 2015), the USB-IF have not released any confirmation about reserving it for this particular purpose.

See also
 MTP (Media Transfer Protocol)
 Personal Computer Memory Card International Association (PCMCIA)
 USB On-The-Go
 Wireless USB

References

External links
 

Implementers Forum
Organizations established in 1995
501(c)(6) nonprofit organizations